The Neenah station, otherwise known as the Neenah-Menasha station or Chicago and Northwestern Railroad Depot is a historic railroad station located at 500 N. Commercial Street in Neenah, Wisconsin. The station was built in 1892 for the Chicago and North Western Railway. The depot was designed by Charles Sumner Frost in the Richardsonian Romanesque style. Passenger service on the line was ceased in 1971.

The depot was added to the National Register of Historic Places on March 7, 1994.

Named trains
In 1962, the Neenah station served three daily trains northbound (four on Sunday) to Green Bay and beyond to Ishpeming, MI, as well as three daily trains southbound to Chicago. These included:

Commuter 400
Flambeau 400
Green Bay 400
Northwoods Fisherman
Peninsula 400
Valley 400

Other stations in Neenah
The Soo Line Railroad also served Neenah. Passenger train service to the Soo Line station ended on January 15, 1965, when the Soo Line Laker between Chicago and the Twin Cities was discontinued.

References

 Adams, Peter J.Chicago and Northwestern Railroad Depot National Register of Historic Places Inventory-Nomination Form, 1992. On file at the National Park Service.

Railway stations on the National Register of Historic Places in Wisconsin
Railway stations in the United States opened in 1892
Former Chicago and North Western Railway stations
National Register of Historic Places in Winnebago County, Wisconsin
Railway stations closed in 1971
Former railway stations in Wisconsin